The State Register of Heritage Places is maintained by the Heritage Council of Western Australia. , 135 places are heritage-listed in the Town of Cambridge, of which 14 are on the State Register of Heritage Places.

List
The Western Australian State Register of Heritage Places, lists the following 14 state registered places within the Town of Cambridge:

References

Cambridge